The T75 Light machine gun is produced by the 205th Arsenal, Ministry of Defense, Republic of China (Taiwan). The T75 is based on the proven Belgian-made FN Minimi LMG incorporating features from the T57 and T74 machine-guns with more modern features. The T75 is slightly heavier but shorter than the Minimi. The T75 is deployed aboard Republic of China Navy and Coast Guard Administration vessels.

References

Light machine guns
5.56×45mm NATO machine guns
Firearms of the Republic of China
Weapons and ammunition introduced in 1992